The Ministry of Corporate Affairs is an Indian government ministry primarily concerned with administration of the Companies Act 2013, the Companies Act 1956, the Limited Liability Partnership Act, 2008, and the Insolvency and Bankruptcy Code, 2016.

It is responsible mainly for the regulation of Indian enterprises in the industrial and services sector. The ministry is mostly run by civil servants of the ICLS cadre. These officers are elected through the Civil Services Examination conducted by Union Public Service Commission. The highest post, Director General of Corporate Affairs (DGCoA), is fixed at Apex Scale for the ICLS. The current minister is Nirmala Sitaraman.

Administration
The ministry administers the following acts:
 The Companies Act, 2013
 The Companies Act, 1956
 Insolvency And Bankruptcy Code, 2016
 The Competition Act, 2002
 The Monopolies and Restrictive Trade Practices Act, 1969
 The Chartered Accountants Act, 1949 [As amended by the Chartered Accountants (Amendment) Act, 2006] 
 The Company Secretaries Act, 1980 [As amended by The Company Secretaries (Amendment) Act, 2006]
 The Cost and Works Accountants Act, 1959 [As Amended By The Cost And Works Accountants (Amendment) Act, 2006]
 Companies (Donation to National) Fund Act, 1951
 The Indian Partnership Act, 1932
 Societies Registration Act, 1860
 The Companies Amendment Act, 2006
 The Limited liability Partnership Act, 2008

In August 2013, The Companies Act, 2013 was passed to regulate corporations by increasing responsibilities of corporate executives and is intended to avoid the accounting scandals such as the Satyam scandal which have plagued India. It replaces The Companies Act, 1956 which has proven outmoded in terms of handling 21st century problems.

The Ministry has constituted a Committee for framing of National Competition Policy (India) and related matters (formulate amendments in the Act) under the Chairmanship of Dhanendra Kumar, former Chairman of Competition Commission of India.

Training Academies

Indian Institute of Corporate Affairs (Only for Central Civil Service Staff Training)

National Apex Bodies
 Institute of Chartered Accountant of India
 Institute of Company Secretaries of India
Institute of Cost and Management Accountants of India
Institution of Valuers

Statutory Professional Body
All India Management Association

Statutory Bodies 

 Competition Commission of India (CCI)
 Insolvency and Bankruptcy Board of India (IBBI)
 Investor Education and Protection Fund Authority (IEPFA)
 National Company Law Appellate Tribunal (NCLAT)
 National Company Law Tribunal (NCLT)
 National Financial Reporting Authority (NFRA)
 Registrar of Companies
 Serious Fraud Investigation Office

List of Ministers For Corporate Affairs

List of Ministers of State

See also
 Registrar of Companies, India
 List of company registers
 Indian Institute of Corporate Affairs
 Ministry of Cooperation (India)
 Ministry of Co-operation (India)

References

External links

 
Corporate Affairs
Ministries established in 1946